Canada holds elections for legislatures or governments in several jurisdictions: for the federal (national) government, provincial and territorial governments, and municipal governments. Elections are also held for self-governing First Nations and for many other public and private organizations including corporations and trade unions. Municipal elections can also be held for both upper-tier (regional municipality or county) and lower-tier (town, village, or city) governments.

Formal elections have occurred in Canada since at least 1792, when both Upper Canada and Lower Canada had their first elections. Canada's first recorded election was held in Halifax in 1758 to elect the 1st General Assembly of Nova Scotia.

All Canadian citizens aged 18 or older who currently reside in Canada as of the polling day (or at any point in their life have resided in Canada, regardless of time away)  may vote in federal elections. The most recent Canadian federal election occurred on September 20, 2021.

Elections for other levels of government may have additional residency or ownership requirements. For example, some municipalities allow both residents and non-resident landowners to vote.

Electoral regulatory bodies 
Elections in Canada (Federal, Province or Territory) are organised by their respective election regulatory bodies, as follows:

National elections (Federal elections)
The Parliament of Canada has two chambers: the House of Commons has 338 members, elected for a maximum four-year term in single-seat electoral districts, and the Senate has 105 members appointed by the governor general on the advice of the prime minister. Senators are given permanent terms (up to age 75) and thus often serve much longer than the prime minister who was primarily responsible for their appointment.

National elections are governed by the Canada Elections Act and administered by an independent agency, Elections Canada. Using the plurality voting system, Canadians vote for their local Member of Parliament (MP), who represents one specific constituency in the House of Commons. The leader of the party most likely to hold the confidence of the House of Commons becomes the prime minister.

Most MPs are members of a political party, although candidates may stand for election as independents unaffiliated with any political party. Since the practice of listing candidates' party affiliation on ballots began with the 1972 election, the Canada Elections Act has required that all local candidates be directly approved by the leader of their affiliated party, effectively centralizing the candidate nomination process. Once candidates are elected, sitting members of parliament are permitted to "cross the floor" switching party affiliation without having to first resign and restand for office under their new affiliation. Sitting members may also be dismissed from or voluntarily leave their party and become independents. As a result, the distribution of seats by party affiliation often fluctuates in between elections.

Although several parties are typically represented in parliament, Canada has historically had two dominant political parties: the Liberal Party and the Conservative Party, which was preceded by the Progressive Conservative Party and the Conservative Party (1867–1942). Every government since Confederation has been either Liberal or Conservative with the exception of the Unionist government during World War I, which was a coalition of Conservatives and Liberals. However, in the 2011 federal election, the (NDP) New Democratic Party of Canada, came a close second, only behind by a few seats. While other parties have sometimes formed the Official Opposition, the 41st Parliament (2011-2015) was the first in which the Liberals did not form either the government or the Official Opposition.

If a government loses a confidence motion, traditionally the prime minister will ask the governor general to call an election and the governor general follows that advice. However, the viceroy's compliance is not assured; the governor general also has the right to seek out another party leader who might be able to command the confidence of the House and ask him or her to form a government. This happened in 1926 and is referred to as the King-Byng Affair.

The five-year time limitation is strictly applied to the life of the parliament or assembly in question—this body is not deemed to have been formed until the return of the writs and ceases to exist the moment it is dissolved. It is therefore possible to run slightly longer than five years between election days, as was the case between the 1930 and 1935 elections. Although the law has allowed for a five-year gap between elections, there have in fact only been two five-year gaps in the last 50 years: between 1974 and 1979 and between 1988 and 1993, and there have in fact been six general elections since 2000.

It is also possible for a general election to be delayed should Canada be embroiled in a war or insurrection.  This provision was enacted to allow Prime Minister Sir Robert Borden to delay a federal election for about a year during World War I. Since then, the provision has only been used twice, both times by provincial governments—Ontario delayed an election for a few weeks in the year following the Armistice in 1918. Saskatchewan was the only jurisdiction to delay a general election by more than a year, due to World War II, but held an election in 1944, six years after the previous vote.

Results

Fixed dates

Section 4 of the Canadian Charter of Rights and Freedoms limits the term of any federal, provincial, or territorial parliament to a maximum of five years after the return of the writs of the last election. On November 6, 2006, the Parliament of Canada amended the Canada Elections Act to introduce a requirement that each federal general election must take place on the third Monday in October in the fourth calendar year after the previous poll, starting with October 19, 2009. Since then, all provinces and territories have enacted similar legislation establishing fixed election dates.

These laws, nevertheless, do not curtail the power of the governor general or a provincial lieutenant governor to dissolve a legislature prior to the fixed election date on the advice of the relevant first minister or due to a motion of no confidence.

By-elections and referendums
By-elections can be held between general elections when seats become vacant through the resignation or death of a member. The date of the by-election is determined by the governor general, who must call it between 11 and 180 days after being notified of the seat vacancy by the Speaker of the House of Commons.

The federal government can also hold nationwide referendums on major issues. The last federal referendum was held in 1992, on proposed constitutional changes in the Charlottetown Accord. On occasion, one particular issue will dominate an election, and the election will in a sense be a virtual referendum. The most recent instance of this was the 1988 election, which was considered by most parties to be a referendum on free trade with the United States.

Qualifications
Every Canadian citizen 18 years of age or older has the right to vote, except for the Chief Electoral Officer and the Deputy Chief Electoral Officer. In the Canada Elections Act, inmates serving a sentence of at least two years were prohibited from voting, but on October 31, 2002, the Supreme Court of Canada ruled in Sauvé v. Canada that such a law violated the section 3 of the Charter, and was rendered of no force or effect.

The federal National Register of Electors is updated to reflect various changes in the Canadian population, including address changes, reaching voting age, naturalization, and death. Every year, about 3,000,000 address changes are processed by Elections Canada from information obtained from the Canada Revenue Agency, Canada Post (via the National Change of Address service), provincial and territorial motor vehicle registrars, and provincial electoral agencies with permanent voters lists. Every year, about 400,000 Canadians reach voting age and 200,000 Canadians die, resulting in changes to the National Register of Electors based on information obtained from the Canada Revenue Agency, provincial and territorial motor vehicle registrars, and provincial electoral agencies with permanent voters lists. Additionally, over 150,000 individuals a year become naturalized Canadians, and are added to the National Register of Electors by Elections Canada based on information obtained from Citizenship and Immigration Canada.

Canadian citizens abroad
Section Three of the Canadian Charter of Rights and Freedoms provides that "every citizen of Canada has the right to vote", including those residing abroad, although the voting age is set by legislation at 18 years of age. From 1993 to 2019, in practice only those citizens 18 years of age or older who reside in Canada or have been abroad for fewer than five years could vote in federal elections. Exemptions to the five-year limit existed for members of the Canadian Armed Forces, employees of the federal or a provincial government stationed abroad, employees of certain international organizations, and their cohabitants. The five-year limit was originally enacted as part of Bill C-114, An Act to Amend the Canada Elections Act, in 1993; these amendments extended the special ballot to certain prisoners, and Canadians "living or travelling" abroad. In September 2005, Jean-Pierre Kingsley, then the Chief Electoral Officer of Canada for 15 years, explicitly recommended in his official report that Parliament remove the five-year limit by amendment, but no action was taken.

In May 2014, a court decision from the Ontario Superior Court of Justice invalidated the five-year limit as an unconstitutional restriction on the right to vote, in violation of Section Three, leading to a period of fourteen months during which all Canadian expatriates could apply to be on the register of electors. However, the decision was reversed 2-1 on appeal at the Court of Appeal for Ontario on July 20, 2015, in a judicial opinion citing Canada's history of using a residence-based electoral district system and a justification based on social contract theory, which held that the five-year limit was a permissible limitation of the constitutional right to vote under Section One. As of August 2015, Elections Canada has implemented changes to its registration process to comply with the latest court ruling, and will require expatriates already on the register to declare an intended date of return.  The decision from the Court of Appeal was subsequently appealed to the Supreme Court of Canada, which announced on April 14, 2016 that it would hear the appeal. On January 11, 2019 the Supreme Court reversed the Court of Appeal's decision and ruled that non-resident citizens have the right to vote regardless of time living outside of Canada.

Length of election campaigns
The length of election campaigns can vary, but under the Elections Act, the minimum length of a campaign is 36 days and the maximum length of the campaign is 50 days.  Also section 5 of the Charter requires that the Parliament sit at least once every twelve months, and thus a campaign would have to conclude in time for returns to be completed and parliament to be called into session within twelve months of the previous sitting.  The federal election date must be set on a Monday (or Tuesday if the Monday is a statutory holiday).

The first two elections, the 1867 election and the 1872 election, took place over several weeks.

The 1872 election was both the second shortest and the longest campaign in history. Parliament was dissolved on July 8, 1872, while the writ was dropped on July 15, 1872. Voting occurred from July 20 to October 12. Therefore, the campaign started 12 days after dissolution of Parliament and 5 days after the writ, and was concluded 96 days (13 weeks plus 5 days) after dissolution and 89 days after the writ.

Every subsequent election has occurred on a single day. Of these elections, the longest election campaign, in terms of days from dissolution to election day, was that of 1926 election, following the King-Byng Affair, which lasted 74 days.

In terms of days from writ to election day, the longest campaign had been the 1980 election, which lasted 66 days. It was surpassed by the 2015 election, which was 78 days long from writ to election day, making it the longest campaign for a one-day election, exceeded in length only by that of 1872.

Prior to the adoption of the minimum of 36 days in law, there were six elections that lasted shorter periods of time. The last of these was the 1904 election which occurred many decades before the minimum was imposed.

In practice, the prime minister will generally keep a campaign as brief as is legal and feasible, because spending by parties is strictly limited by the Elections Act.  The maximum spending by each party is increased by 1/37th of the maximum for each day that the campaign exceeds 37 days.  The 1997, 2000 and 2004 elections were all of the minimum 36 days in length which has led to a common misconception that elections must be 36 days long.  However, prior to 1997, elections averaged much longer: aside from the 47-day campaign for the 1993 election and the 51-day campaign for the 1988 Election, the shortest election period after World War II was 57 days and many were over 60 days in length.

Much speculation had surrounded how long the campaign for the 39th federal election would be in 2006, especially as it became certain the election would be called in the weeks preceding Christmas 2005.  The government of Joe Clark, which fell on December 13, 1979, recommended a campaign of 66 days for the resulting election, and nothing legal barred a similarly lengthened campaign.  In the end, the 2006 election was called on November 29, 2005, for January 23, 2006 — making a 55-day-long campaign.

Provincial and territorial

System
Canada's ten provinces and Yukon use the same plurality voting system used in federal elections. Elections are monitored and organized, however, by independent provincial election commissions, and a province may legally change their electoral system should they wish to do so, without requiring permission from the federal government.

In the territories of Northwest Territories and Nunavut, elections are held on a solely non-partisan basis due to those territories' use of a consensus government model.

Since 2001, most Canadian provinces and the Northwest Territories have passed laws establishing fixed election dates, in most cases calling for elections every four years on a specific day and month.

Parties
All Canadian provinces and Yukon, have electoral systems dominated by major political parties. In most provinces the leading parties are the same parties prominent at the federal level. However, the provincial party may or may not have an official affiliation with the federal party of the same name. Thus, names of provincial parties can sometimes be misleading when associating a provincial party with a national party, although the respective ideologies are usually fairly similar.

The Conservative Party of Canada has no provincial wings and none of the current provincial Progressive Conservative Parties are formally linked with the federal party as they all predate the 2003 establishment of the federal party, which resulted in the formal disbanding of the Progressive Conservative Party of Canada. Some provincial parties (such as Alberta) formally broke off links with the federal party prior to the merger.

In British Columbia, Alberta and Quebec the provincial Liberal parties are independent of the Liberal Party of Canada, while in the other provinces, the provincial Liberal parties are autonomous entities that retain formal links with the federal party.

All provincial wings of the New Democratic Party are fully integrated with the federal party, and members of the provincial party are automatically also members of the federal party. The Green Party has provincial counterparts that are directly affiliated but do not share membership or organizational structure and support.

In Saskatchewan and Yukon, the political parties, the Saskatchewan Party and the Yukon Party, respectively, have no federal counterpart, although they are both ideologically conservative.

Results
The following table summarizes the results of the most recent provincial and territorial elections.  A link to complete lists for each province and territory is below. The winning party is indicated in bold and by the coloured bar at the left of the table.

This table shows the party standings as a result of the most recent election, and not the current representation in legislatures; refer to the articles on the individual houses for the current state.

For lists of general elections in each province and territory, see the infobox at the bottom of the article.

1Note: Nunavut does not have political parties, and political parties in the Northwest Territories were disbanded in 1905. MLAs in both territories are elected as independents and the legislatures function under a consensus government model.

2Note: Provincial Liberal parties that are not affiliated with the federal Liberal Party of Canada.

Municipal

Municipal elections are held in Canada for the election of local governments. Most provinces hold all of their municipal elections on the same date. Candidates are elected through either ward or at-large systems, every two, three or four years, depending on the province. Plurality block voting is used in at-large elections and where wards elect multiple members; otherwise First past the post is used. (London, Ontario did adopt Instant-runoff voting but has been banned from using that system.)

A minority of locations in Canada have local political parties or election slates, while most locations elect only independents, or where the candidate has party ties, no party identification is allowed on the ballot.

Senate nominee (Alberta)

Adopted and attempted reforms
Canada is now the only major country in the world to use only First past the post in its federal and provincial elections. But in past times other systems were used or debated.

Reforms and attempted reforms are outlined below.

Multiple-member districts replaced by single-member districts -- federal elections, all provinces, two territories various dates
At various times in the 19th and 20th centuries, federal elections and those held in every province used multi-member districts to elect all or some of its members. The systems used included Block Voting, Single transferable voting, Limited voting and a system where each seat was filled through a separate contest.

Now federal elections—and all provincial and territorial elections—use only single-member districts, a situation that came about through electoral reform.

Eleven ridings elected multiple MPs (two at a time) at one time or another, between 1867 and 1968. These were Ottawa, West Toronto, Hamilton, Halifax (NS), Cape Breton (NS), Pictou (NS), St. John City and County (NB), Victoria and three in PEI: King's County, Queen's County and Prince County.

All the provinces and territories (except Nunavut) once used multiple-member districts. Most of the multiple-member districts elected just two, but others elected 5 to 7 or more. Ten MLAs were elected in Winnipeg from 1920 to 1949. 

The provinces and territories switched to electing all their members in single-member districts elected through First past the post in these years:

Quebec 1867

Ontario 1893

North-West Territories 1894 (see 1891 North-West Territories general election)

Yukon 1903

Manitoba 1954

Alberta 1956

New Brunswick 1967

Saskatchewan 1967

Newfoundland and Labrador 1975

Nova Scotia 1978

BC 1990

PEI 1996

(PEI's elections were special cases. Each district elected two members. At one time voters who owned property in the district voted for the Councilman while voters resident in the district joined with the property-owners to vote for the Assemblyman. Later the exact same voters were allowed to vote for each of the two members in a district but still each seat was filled in separate contest.)

1886, 1890 Ontario used Limited Voting in Toronto
Toronto's three MPPs were elected through Limited voting, where each voter could cast up to two votes.

1909-1921 Alberta partially adopted Block Voting system
For the 1909, 1913 and 1921 election Alberta adopted multiple-member city-wide districts in one or both of the cities of Edmonton and Calgary. Alberta's two army representatives were elected in 1917 in one contest.  Also in 1921, the city of Medicine Hat was a two-seat district. Voters cast multiple votes under the Plurality block voting to elect MLAs.

1914 Manitoba adopted multi-member districts, later brought in partial STV then STV/IRV
In 1914, the three Winnipeg districts -- Winnipeg Centre,Winnipeg South and Winnipeg North—were each given a second member. Each seat was filled through a separate contest. The same system was used in the 1915 election.

In 1920 Winnipeg was made into a ten-member city-wide district. Manitoba began to use Single transferable voting in the new district. Later the province adopted Alternative Voting in single-member rural districts.

In 1949 St. Boniface got a second member and switched from AV to STV to elect its MLAs.

1924 Alberta adopted STV/AV system
After the election of the United Farmers of Alberta in 1921, Alberta maintained its existing mixture of multi-member districts and single-member districts. In 1924 Alberta adopted Single transferable voting in the cities' multi-member districts and the Instant-runoff voting system in single-member rural districts. This mixed system was in use until 1956. In 1956 the province brought in consistent single-member districts and First past the post elections. Medicine Hat reverted to being a single-member district before the 1930 election.

1922 House of Commons elections
Canadian MP William Charles Good  introduced legislation in the House of Commons in June 1922 that would have seen Instant-runoff voting used in each riding where more than two candidates were competing and he also called for demonstration multi-member districts in to provide experience of proportional representation. However the bill was talked out and nothing was changed.

1952, 1953 BC elections used Instant-runoff voting electoral system
In 1952, BC adopted the Alternative Voting system. It retained its mixture  of single-member districts and multi-member districts. In the later, it held separate contests for each seat. preferential ballots was used for the first time in a BC general election. 
After 1953 election the province returned to its previous electoral system, a mixture of single-member and multi-member districts, of Block Voting and FPTP, which in turn was replaced by consistent FPTP single-member-district contests in 1990.

2004 Quebec proposed electoral reform
The Liberal government of Quebec proposed electoral reform in 2004, which was scheduled to be passed in the fall of 2006 without a referendum. The project was postponed due to divergent views on how to improve it.

2005 BC Single Transferable Vote referendum

In a 2005 referendum 57.7% of British Columbians voted in favour of the Single Transferable Vote system. However the government required a vote of 60% to pass the change, and the vote result was ignored.

2005 PEI Provincial MMP referendum

Prince Edward Island held a referendum in 2005 regarding the adoption of mixed member proportional representation. The motion was defeated.

2007 Ontario MMP referendum

A referendum was held in Ontario in 2007 on the question of whether to establish a mixed member proportional representation (MMP) system for elections to the Legislative Assembly of Ontario. The vote was strongly in favour of the existing plurality voting or first-past-the-post (FPTP) system.

2008 New Brunswick referendum

A referendum on the issue of electoral reform in New Brunswick was proposed for 2008 by the Progressive Conservative Party, but the party was defeated in the September 2006 election and the new Liberal government cancelled the vote.

2009 BC Single Transferable Vote referendum

A referendum for the Single transferable vote (STV) system was held in British Columbia on May 12, 2009. The adoption of STV was defeated, with 39.09% of voters preferring STV over First Past The Post (FPTP).

2015 federal election

In the 2015 federal election, both of the main opposition parties (the federal Liberals and NDP) promised to implement electoral reform no later than the next scheduled election.  The NDP has long supported Mixed Member Proportional, a hybrid system proposed by the Law Commission in which voters would cast two ballots (one for a riding representative and one for their preferred party, with member elected from a regional and open list).

By comparison, the Liberals led by Justin Trudeau promised to review numerous electoral reform options through an "all party parliamentary committee" and to implement the changes in time for the next election.  Trudeau promised to make the 2015 election "Canada's last first-past-the-post election".  There are divisions within the Liberal Party over which alternative system would be better (some prefer a proportional voting system, while others want a single member constituency preferential model); however, the promise by the Liberals, who won a majority in the House of Commons, created expectations that some sort of change will be introduced.

The Liberal members of the special all-committee on electoral reform urged Prime Minister Justin Trudeau to break his promise to change Canada's voting system before the next federal election in 2019. That call for inaction came as opposition members of the committee pressured Trudeau to keep the commitment. In its final report, the government-minority committee recommended the government design a new proportional system and hold a national referendum to gauge Canadians' support.

67% of Canadians voted in 2015 for parties that promised to replace the voting system with one that doesn't distort the vote as much as first past the post. 88% of experts brought forward by the Liberal government recommending a proportional representation voting system, and 96% rejected Trudeau's preferred Instant-runoff voting system. Despite this, on February 1, 2017, the new Liberal Minister of Democratic Institutions, Karina Gould, announced that Trudeau instructed her that a change of voting system would no longer be in her mandate. She cited a lack of broad consensus among Canadians in favour of one particular type of electoral voting as the reason for the abandonment of the 2015 election promise.

During the 2015 election campaign, the Liberal Party of Canada made a promise to implement a process to review the costs of campaign platforms in future elections. It was implemented within an omnibus bill passed in 2017, with responsibility assigned to the Parliamentary Budget Office.

2016 Prince Edward Island electoral reform referendum

The 2016 Plebiscite on Democratic Renewal was a non-binding referendum held in the Canadian province of Prince Edward Island between October 27 – November 7, 2016. The referendum asked which of five voting systems residents would prefer to use in electing members to the Legislative Assembly of Prince Edward Island. The referendum was conducted using Instant runoff voting, and no option was the choice of a majority in the first count. After three options were eliminated due to being un-electable, mixed member proportional representation received more than 52% support on the final count. But government ignored the result, holding another referendum in 2019.

2018 British Columbia Electoral Reform Referendum

In accordance to campaign promises, the BC NDP (In a confidence and supply agreement with the Greens) scheduled a plebiscite to be held between October 22 and November 30, 2018, with voting done through mail for those registered to vote. 61.3% of voters voted for retaining First Past The Post.

2019 Prince Edward Island Electoral Reform Referendum

the 2019 referendum ended in defeat.
On the question "Should Prince Edward Island change its voting system to a mixed member proportional voting system?", 52 percent voted against change while only 48 percent voted in favour. But neither side took a majority of votes in 60 percent of the districts so government did not consider it a clear decision. In 2021/2022, PEI again investigated switching away from the FPTP system.

2022 Quebec proposed electoral reform
CAQ François Legault was elected on a promise to reform the electoral system within a year of his victory in 2018.  On September 25, 2019, Minister of Justice Sonia LeBel presented Bill 39, An Act to establish a new electoral system which aims to replace the First-past-the-post electoral system in favour of a mixed-member proportional representation system.  According to the bill, the National Assembly would have kept 125 members. Of the 125 members, 80 would have been elected by receiving a plurality of votes in single-member districts matching the 78 federal ridings with the addition of 2 unique districts: Îles-de-la-Madeleine and Ungava). The remaining 45 members would have been chosen according to their order in a regional party list. All 17 regions of Québec would have been guaranteed at least one MNA.

Bill 39 was intended to be debated in the legislature before June 2021. The bill's implementation would have been contingent on popular support expressed in a referendum held on the same day as the general election. Was this referendum successful, then the first legislature to be elected under mixed-member proportional would have been the 44th, in October 2026 at the latest. On April 28, 2021, Justice Minister LeBel informed a legislative committee hearing that the government would not move forward with a referendum on electoral reform in 2022. LeBel blamed the COVID-19 pandemic for altering the government's timeline and could not commit to providing an alternate date for the referendum, effectively ending discussions about electoral reform in Quebec.

See also

 Canadian electoral calendar
 Canadian electoral system
 Canadian House of Commons Special Committee on Electoral Reform
 Democracy Day (Canada)
 Electronic voting in Canada
 Fair Vote Canada
 Federal political financing in Canada
 List of Canadian federal electoral districts
 List of Canadian federal general elections
 List of elections in the Province of Canada (pre-Confederation)
 List of federal by-elections in Canada
 List of political parties in Canada
 Past Canadian electoral districts
 Referendums in Canada
 Timeline of Canadian elections
 Voter turnout in Canada

Notes

References

External links
Elections Canada
CBC Digital Archives—Voting in Canada: How a Privilege Became a Right
CBC Digital Archives—Campaigning for Canada
Canadian Governments Compared
U.S. State Department estimates of Canadian elections
Canada Elections Atlas - Federal

 
Politics of Canada
Government in Canada
Political history of Canada